Chute-aux-Outardes is a village municipality in Quebec, Canada, at the mouth of the Outardes River.

Demographics 

Population trend:
 Population in 2021: 1391 (2006 to 2011 population change: -11%)
 Population in 2016: 1563 
 Population in 2011: 1644 
 Population in 2006: 1853
 Population in 2001: 1968
 Population in 1996: 2155
 Population in 1991: 2161

Mother tongue:
 English as first language: 0.4%
 French as first language: 99.6%
 English and French as first language: 0%
 Other as first language: 0%

Education
Centre de services scolaire de l'Estuaire operates francophone public schools, including:
 École Richard

The Eastern Shores School Board operates anglophone public schools, including:
 Baie Comeau High School in Baie-Comeau

References

Incorporated places in Côte-Nord
Villages in Quebec